Shute may refer to:

Places
 Shute, Devon, village in Devon, near Axminster 
 Shute Barton, mediaeval manor house, located at Shute
 Shute Harbour, Australia
 Shute Park (Oregon), park in Hillsboro, Oregon

People with the surname
 Attwood Shute, mayor of Philadelphia
 Sir Cameron Shute (1866–1936), British Army general
 Sir Charles Cameron Shute (1816–1904), British army general and Conservative Party politician
 David Shute, British journalist
 David Shute (born 1971), American Ice hockey player
 Denny Shute (1904–1974), American golfer
 Evan Shute (1905-1978), Canadian obstetrician, poet and writer
 Gareth Shute (born 1973), New Zealand author, musician and journalist
 Henry Shute (1856–1943), American lawyer
 Jackie Shute (1901–1988), Australian rugby union player
 Jenefer Shute, South African writer
 Jermaine Shute (born 1984),  American rapper and businessman, better known as Starlito
 John Shute (architect) (died 1563), English artist and architect
 John Shute Barrington, 1st Viscount Barrington, born John Shute (1678–1734), English lawyer and theologian 
 John W. Shute (1840–1922), American banker
 Sir John Shute (politician) (1873–1948), British army officer, businessman and conservative politician
 Josias Shute (1588–1643), English churchman
 Michael Shute (1951–2020), Canadian scholar
 Nerina Shute (1908–2004), British writer and journalist 
 Nevil Shute, pen-name of Nevil Shute Norway (1899–1960), popular novelist and aeronautical engineer
 Percy George Shute (1894–1977), English malariologist and entomologist
 Phil Shute (born 1953), English footballer
 Richard Shute (1849–1886), British classicist and logician
 Robert Shute (died 1590), English judge and politician
 Robert Shute (died 1621), English lawyer and politician
 Samuel Shute (1662–1742), English military officer and royal governor of the provinces of Massachusetts and New Hampshire
 Samuel Addison Shute and Ruth Whittier Shute (1803–1836 and 1803–1882), American artists

See also
 Shute Shield, rugby union competition in Sydney, New South Wales
 Chute (disambiguation)
 Shoot (disambiguation)